Dalvey railway station, also known as Dalvie railway station, served the burgh of Forres, Moray, Scotland, from 1863 to 1868 on the Strathspey Railway.

History 
The station opened on 1 July 1863 by the Strathspey Railway. It was a short-lived station, closing five years later on 1 September 1868.

References

External links 

Disused railway stations in Moray
Railway stations in Great Britain opened in 1863
Railway stations in Great Britain closed in 1868
1863 establishments in Scotland
1868 disestablishments in Scotland